Nancy Amanda Redd (born April 28, 1981) is an American author who was Miss Virginia in 2003 and competed in Miss America, finishing in the top ten and winning the preliminary "Lifestyle & Fitness in Swimwear" competition.

She authored the book Body Drama: Real Girls, Real Bodies, Real Issues, Real Answers and is a host of HuffPost Live.

She is also the author of Diet Drama: Feed Your Body! Move Your Body! Love Your Body and Pregnancy, OMG!: The First Ever Photographic Guide for Modern Mamas-to-Be.

Early life and education 
Nancy Amanda Redd was born in Martinsville, Virginia on April 28, 1981. As a child in Virginia, she was active in 4-H, and was in Girls State in high school. In February 2002, while attending Harvard University, Redd won $250,000 on Who Wants to Be a Millionaire, and donated a considerable amount of her winnings to 4-H. Redd was one of Glamour's Top Ten College Women in October 2002. Redd graduated from Harvard with honors in 2003, with a degree in women's studies.

Pageantry

Miss Virginia 2003

Miss America 2003

Career

Books 
Redd is the author of many nonfiction books, including the New York Times bestseller Body Drama. Her other nonfiction works on women's bodies include Diet Drama and Pregnancy OMG!.

Redd's first children's book, Bedtime Bonnet, was released in 2020. She wrote the book for her daughter to celebrate "black nighttime hair routines". Redd's second children's book is entitled The Real Santa, which was released in 2021. The book's goal was to fill a demand in the black community for representation of a black Santa Claus.

Hosting 
Redd was a longtime host of HuffPost Live, which ran from 2012 to 2016. Redd hosted her last segment in 2015. Redd would go on to host the show SoMe in 2016.

Personal life 
Redd is married to Indian-American actor Rupak Ginn. They have two children, a son named August and a daughter also named Nancy.

Bibliography 
 Body Drama: Real Girls, Real Bodies, Real Issues, Real Answers (2007)
 Diet Drama: Feed Your Body! Move Your Body! Love Your Body! (2010)
 Pregnancy, OMG!: The First Ever Photographic Guide for Modern Mamas–to–Be (2018)
 Bedtime Bonnet (2020; with illustrator Nneka Myers)
 The Real Santa (2021; with illustrator Charnelle Pinkney Barlow)

References

External links 
Official website

 Body Drama: Real Girls, Real Bodies, Real Issues, Real Answers by Nancy Redd

1981 births
American beauty pageant winners
Harvard University alumni
Living people
Miss America 2004 delegates
Miss America Preliminary Swimsuit winners
People from Martinsville, Virginia
Miss Virginia winners